Sonny Boy is a 1961 album by jazz saxophonist Sonny Rollins comprising four tracks from his final recordings for the Prestige label, three of which were originally released on Tour de Force, along with an unissued performance from the session that produced Rollins Plays for Bird.

Reception

AllMusic critic Scott Yanow states: "Tour de Force is a more logical purchase, although the music on this CD does feature the immortal tenor saxophonist in fine form."

Track listing
All compositions by Sonny Rollins except where noted.
 "Ee-Ah" – 6:52
 "B. Quick" – 9:13
 "B. Swift" – 5:15
 "The House I Live In" (Lewis Allan, Earl Robinson) – 9:21
 "Sonny Boy" (Lew Brown, Buddy DeSylva, Ray Henderson, Al Jolson) – 8:22
Recorded at Van Gelder Studio in Hackensack, New Jersey on October 5 (track 4) and December 7 (tracks 1-3 & 5), 1956

Personnel
Sonny Rollins – tenor saxophone
Kenny Dorham – trumpet (backgrounds track 4)
Kenny Drew (tracks 1-3 & 5), Wade Legge (track 4) – piano
George Morrow – bass
Max Roach – drums

References

1961 albums
Prestige Records albums
Sonny Rollins albums
Albums recorded at Van Gelder Studio
Albums produced by Bob Weinstock